Sergeant Ryker is a 1963 drama–war film directed by Buzz Kulik and starring Lee Marvin and Bradford Dillman that was initially run on television but released theatrically five years later in 1968. The film was originally broadcast on television as "The Case Against Paul Ryker", a 1963 two-part episode of Kraft Suspense Theatre.  It was released as a feature film in 1968 to capitalize on Marvin's popularity from The Dirty Dozen. Its second run paired it as a double feature with Counterpoint (1968) starring Charlton Heston.

Plot
Sgt. Ryker (Lee Marvin) is an American soldier charged with treason during the Korean War, he is court-martialed and prosecuted by Capt. David Young (Bradford Dillman) and convicted and sentenced to death.

Ryker's wife, Ann (Vera Miles), insists that her husband received an inadequate defense. She believes his story that he had been on a secret mission, assigned by a superior officer who has since died and can no longer vouch for him.

Capt. Young believes Ryker is guilty, but he, too, thinks Ryker received an inadequate legal defense. He persuades the commanding general to give Ryker a new trial. The general reluctantly does so, but he insists that this time Young must serve as Ryker's defense counsel. Ryker has already resigned himself to his fate, and has to be persuaded to go along with the retrial. As it unfolds, all the evidence is damning to Ryker, the best Young can do is establish that Ryker's version of events is not impossible. The defense is also undermined by several of Ryker's lies and omissions, which are exposed during testimony at the trial, and also by Ryker's occasional fits of temper. A further complication ensues when a romantic attachment develops between Young and Ryker's wife. Ryker is furious when he realizes it has happened, and the general on hearing about it tells Young he will be court-martialed as soon as Ryker's trial is over.

The prosecutor, Maj. Whitaker, unearths new evidence damning to the defendant's case, and all seems lost. At the last minute, however, Young learns some information from a Sergeant Winkler, which verifies some aspects of Ryker's claim, and which when followed up on by Young, is enough to compel that Ryker be set free.

Cast
Lee Marvin as Sgt. Paul Ryker
Bradford Dillman as Capt. David Young
Peter Graves as Maj. Whitaker
Vera Miles as Ann Ryker
Lloyd Nolan as Gen. Amos Bailey
Murray Hamilton as Capt. Appleton
Norman Fell as Sgt. Max Winkler
Walter Brooke as Col. Arthur Merriam
Francis DeSales as President of the Court
Don Marshall as Cpl. Jenks
Charles Aidman as Maj. Kitchener

See also
List of American films of 1968

References

External links

1963 American television episodes
1968 films
1960s war drama films
American war drama films
Films scored by John Williams
Films directed by Buzz Kulik
Korean War films
Military courtroom films
Universal Pictures films
Films edited from television programs
1968 drama films
1960s English-language films
1960s American films